Lovers of Midnight
(French: Les Amants de minuit) is a 1953 French drama film directed by Roger Richebé and starring Dany Robin, Jean Marais and Louis Seigner. In other countries the film was known under titles including Lovers of Midnight (English), De älskande vid midnatt (Sweden), and Keskiyön rakastavaiset (Finland).
The film's sets were designed by Robert Dumesnil.

Main cast 
 Jean Marais as Marcel Dulac
 Dany Robin as Françoise Letanneur
 Louis Seigner as M. Paul
 Micheline Gary as Monique
 Frédérique Nadar as Irène
 Gisèle Grandpré as Mme. Paul
 Sylvie Rameau as La femme de l'avocat
 Jacques Eyser as L'avocat
 Nicole Rozan as La clente rêveche
 Cécilia Bert as M. Torquato

References

External links 

 Les Amants de minuit (1953) at the Films de France

1953 films
French comedy films
French drama films
1950s French-language films
French black-and-white films
Films directed by Roger Richebé
1953 drama films
1950s French films